Innerpeffray Library was the first lending library in Scotland. The library building is Category A listed.

St Mary's Chapel 
Innerpeffray Library started in 1680 in the attic of St Mary's Chapel, Church of the Blessed Virgin, or Innerpeffray Chapel as it has later been known.

The chapel is mentioned from 1365 and is linked to Lord John Drummond. The chapel may have started as a chantry, however, by 1542 it was referred to as a collegiate church which served the parish of Monzie.

During the Scottish Reformation in the 16th century, the chapel was damaged considerably; the lands and endowments were passed to James Drummond, the first Lord Madertie. James married Jean, daughter of Sir James Chisolm of Cromlix; however, James passed away in 1620.

Innerpeffray Castle was built close to the chapel in 1610, the chapel's use after the Scottish Reformation meant that it was never again used as a Protestant place of worship but instead was used for as a mausoleum for the Drummond family, as well as a Catholic place of worship.

Early History of the Building 
David Drummond, the third Lord Madertie requested in his will that a library be kept partly in the west end of the chapel and partly in a building he had recently constructed in the east end of the kirkyard. This was to house David's large collection of books in religion, witchcraft, demonology and astrology. David died in 1692, and the Governors of the Innerpeffray Mortification, a registered charity under Scottish law, started to administer and maintain the collection in 1694. The library was to be devoted for the use of the public and became the first public lending library in Scotland.

In 1739, Robert Hay Drummond inherited the Innefpeffray Estate, he commissioned the architect Charles Freebairn to erect the purpose-built library and reading room. The Georgian building was built to house the Drummond family collection as well as Robert's own collection which he donated to the library.

Innerpeffray Library 
The library ceased lending in 1968; however, it remains open to the public several days a week, from March through to the end of October. Hours of operation are Wednesday to Saturday 10am-5pm and Sunday 2pm-5pm.

Collection 
Among the collection that the library holds is the Bible of the Marquis of Montrose, bearing his autograph in several places. There is also a copy of what is called the Great Bible, dated 1540, which has two full-page woodcuts by Holbein, the artist of Henry VIII of England.

The library remains a valuable storehouse of literature from the Late Medieval and Early Modern periods and has been visited by many people throughout the years that it has been open.

One of the Library's most valued books is the original Borrowers' Register that holds the record of all the families who borrowed a book. This resource allows people to come and identify their ancestors from the region, see their own handwriting and hold the books they once borrowed.

Keeper of the Books 
The Keeper of Books is an office held continuously since Andrew Patoune in 1696. The Keeper also holds the key of the Collegiate Chapel of St Mary, at Her Majesty's pleasure.

The current Keeper of Books, as of 2019, is listed as Lara Haggerty.

The library in the media 
The BBC broadcast from the library on the 31st of January, 1950.

See also
List of Category A listed buildings in Perth and Kinross

References

Further reading
Chronicles of Innerpeffray by Anne Edgar, also "St Mary's Chapel", "The Lords Madertie" and "Captain Robert Hay Drummond, a Crimea Officer", three booklets by the same Author, Keeper and Librarian 2005–2009.
"Publicity Information on Innerpeffray, 365 words" by CM Edgar MA PGCE, joint Keeper 2005-2009 and, by courtesy of the Earl of Perth, Lay Provost of St Mary's (short title, honour still held by CME).
'The First Light' by George Chamier, 2009

External links

 The Guardian: Love letters to libraries: Alexander McCall Smith
 Innerpeffray Library collection at the University of Stirling Archive

Libraries in Scotland
1680 establishments in Scotland
Buildings and structures in Perth and Kinross
Category A listed buildings in Perth and Kinross
Listed library buildings in Scotland
Buildings and structures completed in 1762
Library buildings completed in the 18th century
Charities based in Scotland